Sarfaraz Ashraf (born 2 November 1989) is an Indian cricketer. He made his List A debut on 10 October 2019, for Bihar in the 2019–20 Vijay Hazare Trophy. He made his first-class debut on 27 January 2020, for Bihar in the 2019–20 Ranji Trophy.

References

External links
 

1989 births
Living people
Indian cricketers
Bihar cricketers